Thiha (Burmeze: သီဟ) is a Burmese name that may refer to

Hein Thiha Zaw (born 1995), Burmese football defender 
Maha Thiha Thura (disambiguation)
Thiha Zaw (born 1993), Burmese football midfielder 
Thiha Zaw (footballer, born 1994), Burmese football defender
Thiha (footballer), Burmese football midfielder

See also
Hermits Tissa and Thiha, Burmese Buddhist monks

Burmese names